The Utah Falconz are a women's American football team from Salt Lake City, Utah playing in the Women's National Football Conference. Founded in 2013, home games are played at the Cottonwood High School football field.

Championships 
The Utah Falconz have been in the championship game for the past three years of the Independent Women's Football League, losing 41–37 to the Pittsburgh Passion in 2015, and winning back-to-back titles in 2016 and 2017.

Season results

2017

2014

See also

Women's gridiron football
List of female American football teams
Women's Football in the United States

References 

Independent Women's Football League
American football teams in Utah
Sports in Salt Lake City
American football teams established in 2013
2013 establishments in Utah
Women's sports in Utah